The ITF Women's Circuit UBS Thurgau was a tournament for professional female tennis players played on indoor carpet courts. The event was classified as a $50,000 ITF Women's Circuit tournament and was held in Kreuzlingen from 2013 to 2016.

Past finals

Singles

Doubles

External links 
 ITF search 
 Official website 

ITF Women's World Tennis Tour
Carpet court tennis tournaments
Tennis tournaments in Switzerland
Sport in Switzerland
Recurring sporting events established in 2013
Recurring sporting events disestablished in 2016
Defunct sports competitions in Switzerland